Simon Rawidowicz (1897–1957) was a Polish-born American Jewish philosopher.

Early life
Simon Rawidowicz was born in 1896 in Grajewo, Poland to Chaim Yitzchak Rawidowicz (later Ravid), a Zionist activist, a travelling merchant, a writer, and a pioneer farmer, and to Chana Batya (nee. Rembelinker). A second of ten children – seven of whom survived childhood – he studied at the modern Yeshiva at Lida. Rawidowicz received a traditional Jewish education, during the course of which he became attracted to the Haskalah and Modern Hebrew literature. He was drawn to the reviving Hebrew language and literature, and before turning 18 he became a teacher at the Cheder Metukan. He was educated in Germany. 1933 he emigrated to the United Kingdom.

He married Esther Klee in 1926, the daughter of Alfred Klee and the maternal aunt of Hanneli Goslar (Anne Frank's best friend).

Career
Rawidowicz taught at the Jews' College in London and at the Leeds University (as of 1941). In 1948 he emigrated to the United States, first teaching at the College of Jewish Studies of Chicago. Rawidowicz served as the chair of the Department of Near-Eastern and Judaic Studies at Brandeis University. He was the author of several books and essays, some of which were published posthumously.

Rawidowicz was a critic of zionism. In his essay entitled Between Jew and Arab, he suggested that early Arab refugees in Israel were treated differently from Jews as early as 1948. In The Ever-Dying People, he argued that each generation of Jews was afraid of extinction.

Death
Rawidowicz died of a heart attack in 1957 in Waltham, Massachusetts.

Works

Further reading

References

1897 births
1957 deaths
Polish emigrants to the United States
Brandeis University faculty
American essayists
Jewish philosophers
Jewish emigrants from Nazi Germany to the United Kingdom
20th-century essayists
Anne Frank
People from Grajewo
American people of Polish-Jewish descent